Kenneth Max Copeland (born December 6, 1936) is an American televangelist associated with the charismatic movement. The organization he founded in 1967, Eagle Mountain International Church Inc. (EMIC), is based in Tarrant County, Texas. Copeland's sermons are broadcast across the US and worldwide on the Victory Channel. Copeland has also written several books and resources.

He preaches the prosperity gospel and is part of the Word of Faith movement. Copeland has written that parishioners will get a "hundredfold" return on their investment through giving to God. 

During the COVID-19 pandemic in 2020, Copeland claimed that the pandemic had ended or would soon end and that his followers would be healed from the virus. He stated that followers should continue paying tithes if they lost their jobs in the economic crisis that the pandemic caused.

Early life
Kenneth Max Copeland was born in Lubbock, Texas, to Aubrey Wayne and Vinita Pearl (née Owens) Copeland. He was raised in West Texas near a United States Army Air Forces airfield, which inspired him to become a pilot.

Career
Copeland was a recording artist on the Imperial Records label, having one Billboard Top 40 hit ("Pledge of Love", which charted in the Top 40 on April 20, 1957, stayed on the charts for 15 weeks, and peaked at #17). Copeland devoted his life to the gospel and ministry work.

In the fall of 1967, he enrolled in Oral Roberts University, where he soon became pilot and chauffeur to Oral Roberts.

Ministry

In 1967, after attending Kenneth E. Hagin's Pastor Seminars, Copeland and his wife Gloria founded Kenneth Copeland Ministries (KCM) in Fort Worth, Texas. The ministry's motto is "Jesus is Lord". He has claimed in an interview that the ministry has "brought over 122 million people to the Lord Jesus Christ".

Television and other programming
Since 1967, Copeland's ministry has held three-to-six-day conventions across the United States. KCM still holds an annual Southwest Believer's Convention in his hometown of Fort Worth during the first week of August. Kenneth and Gloria Copeland also preach and minister at other conventions and conferences throughout the world. These events stream live on Copeland's website, kcm.org, as well as being shown on Christian television stations such as GOD TV and the Daystar Television Network. Portions of recorded conferences are shown on Sundays. The Monday through Friday television broadcasts feature a Copeland family member, either alone or with another minister, discussing subjects from the Bible.

On May 27, 1971, KCM began a one hour television program. This program called "The Word of Faith" would become what is now known as the "Believers Voice of Victory". In 1972 another television program was launched called "The Prayer Group". This was a half hour television program aired across the United States.

Facilities
Kenneth Copeland Ministries is located in Fort Worth, Texas, on a  property valued in 2008 at $554,160 by Tarrant Appraisal District. The site includes the Eagle Mountain International Church, television and radio production facilities, warehouse and distribution facilities, residences for the Copeland family, and Kenneth Copeland Airport. Approximately 500 people are employed by KCM. Kenneth's son John Copeland was the ministry's chief operating officer until his divorce from Marty Copeland in 2017. He remains a consultant to the ministry.

KCM also owns a 1998 Cessna 550 Citation Bravo, which it received from a donor in October 2007 and is used for domestic flights, and a 2005 Cessna 750 Citation X, which it uses for international flights. They also acquired a Gulfstream V in 2018 that was formerly owned by Tyler Perry. It also is restoring a 1962 Beech H-18 Twin, which the ministry plans to use for disaster relief efforts.

In February 2007, Copeland was accused of using his ministry's Citation X for personal vacations and friends. The Copelands' financial records are not publicly available, and a list of the board of directors is not accessible as these details are protected but known confidentially by the Internal Revenue Service. Responding to media questions, Copeland pointed to what he asserted was an accounting firm's declaration that all jet travel complies with federal tax laws. In December 2008, KCM's Citation Bravo was denied tax exemption after KCM refused to submit a standardized Texas Comptroller form that some county appraisal districts use to make determinations, which would have required making public the salary of all ministry staff. KCM subsequently filed suit with the Tarrant Appraisal District in January 2009 and its petition to have the aircraft's tax-exempt status restored was granted in March 2010.

Kenneth Copeland Ministries has utilized the Federal Aviation Administration program that keeps flights private from tracking websites, and the ministry owns five such aircraft whose flights are kept private, including the Cessna 750 Citation X noted above and a North American T-28 Trojan. United States Senator Chuck Grassley has questioned some of the flights taken by these aircraft, including layovers in Maui, Fiji, and Honolulu. The ministries say that the stopovers were for preaching or for allowing pilot rest.

Kenneth Copeland Bible College
Kenneth Copeland Bible College (KCBC) is located on the property of Kenneth Copeland Ministries and Eagle Mountain International Church (EMIC). KCBC is an accredited member with Transworld Accrediting Commission International.

Victory Channel
In 2015, KCM launched the Believer's Voice of Victory Network on channel 265 on Dish. Believer's Voice of Victory Network was renamed Victory Channel in 2019, and is available over-the-air and on some cable providers. On October 2, 2020, the Believer's Voice of Victory (BVOV) stopped broadcasting on the Trinity Broadcasting Network (TBN). At the start of 2022, it was added on several national cable systems under a new channel lease with Olympusat, which had previously offered Hillsong Channel and Living Faith Network, then Bulldog Shopping Network, on the channel space.

In 2020, Flashpoint began airing on the Victory Channel. This program has risen in viewership and popularity since it's launch. It is hosted by Gene Bailey and is described as offering cultural commentary on key issues facing America. Guests on the show have included Donald Trump, Mike Lindell, Mario Marillo, and Lance Wallnau.

Advisory board
Copeland sat on the evangelical executive advisory board that Donald Trump assembled during his campaign for the presidency. Appointment to the board did not require endorsement of his bid for presidency, and Copeland clarified that he did not endorse Trump at the time. Before the 2016 election, Copeland said that Christians who did not vote for Trump would be guilty of murder, referring to the pro-choice stance of Hillary Clinton. In an interview after a state dinner at the White House that Copeland attended, he said that Trump was "led by the Spirit of God", and that his most important legacy as president would be the appointments of conservative judges. On November 5, 2022 Copeland gave a short speech and prayed for Donald Trump at the Latrobe Rally held at the Arnold Palmer Regional Airport.

Personal life
Copeland has been married three times. His first marriage was to Ivy Bodiford in October 1955. They had one child, daughter Terri Copeland Pearsons; they divorced in 1958. He was then married to Cynthia Davis from 1958 to 1961. 

Copeland then married Gloria (née Neece) on April 13, 1963. They have been married for 59 years. They are the parents of John Copeland, Kellie Copeland, and Terri Copeland Pearsons. Gloria co-hosts the ministry's flagship broadcast, The Believer's Voice of Victory, alongside her husband.

Kellie preaches throughout the United States, as does Terri, who also preaches at Eagle Mountain International Church, which is pastored by her husband George Pearsons.

Copeland has amassed significant wealth during his career and has referred to himself as a "very wealthy man".

Controversy

2006 Angel Flight 44 Controversy
According to The Christian Post, Kenneth Copeland Ministries was criticized in 2010 for failing to fly disaster relief missions to Haiti after allegedly promising an aviation relief assistance program called "Angel Flight 44". The Angel Flight 44 ministry was announced by Kenneth Copeland Ministries in 2006 and the ministry attempted to raise money to fund it. Richard Vermillion, co-author of a book on Angel Flight 44 commissioned by Kenneth Copeland Ministries, said that Copeland promised to form the aviation ministry but now believes it was never created. A spokesperson for Kenneth Copeland Ministries, Stephen Swisher, said "This was not a specific promise with a timeline attached", and said that the money was spent on airplane repairs.

Mike Huckabee controversy and Senate Finance Committee Inquiry
In late November 2007, Mike Huckabee, a 2008 Republican presidential primary candidate, made six appearances on Copeland's daily television program Believer's Voice of Victory. In January 2008, the Huckabee campaign paid to use Kenneth Copeland Ministries' facilities for a fundraiser. The fundraising at the church was criticized by the Trinity Foundation.

As a result of the Huckabee appearances, in December 2007, Kenneth Copeland Ministries was one of six ministries investigated in the United States Senate inquiry into the tax-exempt status of religious organizations, led by Senator Chuck Grassley. Kenneth Copeland Ministries was one of four that did not cooperate with the Senate Finance Committee's requests for information or volunteer to make reforms. The investigation could not conclude that the Copelands made personal profit from financial donations.

Senator Grassley's report chronicled the difficulties the Committee faced in attempting to procure requested information from Kenneth Copeland Ministries, including the intimidation of employees. Several former employees of EMIC/KCM indicated that they were sincerely afraid to provide statements for fear of being sued since they signed confidentiality agreements. One former employee stated, "The Copelands employ guerrilla tactics to keep their employees silent. We are flat out told and threatened that if we talk, God will blight our finances, strike our families down, and pretty much afflict us with everything evil and unholy. Rather, God will allow Satan to do those things to us because we have stepped out from under His umbrella of protection, by touching God's anointed Prophet." Further, employees were encouraged to shun and treat badly anyone who speaks out.

2013 vaccination controversy
In 2013, a measles outbreak with 25 confirmed cases in Tarrant County was attributed in the press to anti-vaccination sentiments expressed by members of the Copeland Ministries. The church denied making any such statements and urged members to get vaccinations, even offering free immunizations through the church itself. Pastor Terri Copeland Pearsons, who is Copeland's daughter, offered free vaccination clinics and advised those who did not attend one of the clinics to quarantine themselves at home for two weeks. In a statement on the church website, Pearsons said she was not against immunizations, but also raised concerns about them.

Private jets
In 2008, the ministry stated it owned five airplanes, one of which is valued at $17.5 million. In 2009, Copeland's $3.6 million jet was denied tax-exempt status, opening up a possible investigation into the church's expenses; Copeland also failed to disclose the salaries of his directors.

Copeland's ministry bought a multi-million dollar Gulfstream V jet airplane. The jet was bought from filmmaker and businessman Tyler Perry. As of August 2018, Copeland had requested another $19.5 million for the building of a hangar, upgrading of the runway, and maintenance.

Copeland's and other televangelists' use of private jets, luxury cars and lavish houses has been criticized. In 2015, Copeland, in a broadcast alongside fellow televangelist Jesse Duplantis, defended the use of private jets as a necessary part of their ministry, comparing flying in a commercial plane to getting "in a long tube with a bunch of demons".

COVID-19
On March 11, 2020, Copeland claimed to heal viewers of his TV show of the disease, asking them to touch the television set as he prayed for them.

In a broadcast, Copeland called it a weak strain of the flu. He also said that he did not agree with pastors who cancelled their services due to the coronavirus. Copeland repeatedly said during the pandemic that it had ended or would soon end, and that God told him that it would soon be over as Christians' prayers have overwhelmed it. On March 29, 2020, in a televised sermon, Copeland claimed that it was "finished" and "over" and that the US was now "healed and well again". As many lost their jobs in the economic crisis that the outbreak caused, Copeland advised the faithful to continue paying tithes to a church even if they had lost their jobs. From August 3 through 8, 2020, KCM hosted the Southwest Believers' Conference at the Fort Worth Convention Center in Fort Worth, despite restrictions on social gatherings to limit the spread of the pandemic. Local leaders criticized the event, attended by hundreds of people, but were unable to enforce public health restrictions because religious gatherings were exempt under Governor Greg Abbott's executive orders.

False claims about the 2020 presidential election
On November 8, 2020, Copeland led attendants at a church service in mock laughter at the 2020 US presidential election results. Prior to laughing for "at least 30 seconds", Copeland exclaimed, "The media said what? ... The media said Joe Biden's president!"

Selected KCM publications and recordings
 Load Up Pocket Devotional: 31 Devotions to Revolutionize Your Future (Harrison House, 2004) 
 You Are Healed (Kenneth Copeland Publications, 1999) 
 A Ceremony of Marriage (Kenneth Copeland Publications, 1996) 
 Prayer: Your Foundation for Success (Kenneth Copeland Publications, 1999) 
 Kenneth Copeland Reference Bible – Leather Bound (Kenneth Copeland Publications, 1996) 
 Becoming Subject to the Authority of Jesus (Kenneth Copeland Publications, 2001) 
 How to Discipline Your Flesh (Kenneth Copeland Publications, 1999) 
 From Faith to Faith: A Daily Guide to Victory (Harrison House, 2000) 
 Pursuit of His Presence: Daily Devotional (Harrison House, 1998)  
 The Wake-up Call (Kenneth Copeland Publications, 2002) 
 Classic Redemption (Kenneth Copeland Publications, 2001) 
 The Laws of Prosperity (Kenneth Copeland Publications, 1995) 
 Prosperity: The Choice Is Yours (Kenneth Copeland Publications, 1992) 
 Healing Promises (Kenneth Copeland Publications, 1994) 
 Over the Edge: Youth Devotional (Harrison House, 1998) 
 Big Band Gospel (KCP Records, 2003)
 Racism in the Church. Kill the Root, Destroy the Tree (Kenneth Copeland Publications, 2016) 
 The Power of the Tongue (Kenneth Copeland Publications, 1980) ISBN 978-1-57562-113-5

See also
 Tony Palmer (bishop)
 Trinity Foundation (Dallas)
 Ulf Ekman

References

External links
 Kenneth Copeland Ministries official site
 Eagle Mountain International Church
 Victory Channel

1936 births
Living people
American Pentecostal pastors
American television evangelists
American Charismatics
Imperial Records artists
Internet memes introduced in 2020
Oral Roberts University people
People from Fort Worth, Texas
People from Lubbock, Texas
Pentecostal writers
Oral Roberts University alumni
American faith healers
Prosperity theologians
Pentecostals from Texas
Texas Republicans